A tremor is an involuntary rhythmic shaking of one or more body parts.

Tremor may also refer to:

 Earthquake, a sudden shaking of the Earth
 Episodic tremor and slip, a non-earthquake seismic rumbling

Film and television
 Tremors (franchise), a series of monster films and a TV series
 Tremors (1990 film), the first film in the series
 Tremors 2: Aftershocks (1996), the second film in the series
 Tremors 3: Back to Perfection (2001), the third film in the series
 Tremors (TV series), a 2003 series based on the films
 Tremors 4: The Legend Begins (2004), the fourth film in the series 
 Tremors 5: Bloodlines (2015), the fifth film in the series
 Tremors: A Cold Day in Hell (2018), the sixth film in the series
 Tremors: Shrieker Island (2020), the seventh film in the series
 Tremors (2019 film), or Temblores, a 2019 film by Jayro Bustamante
 Tremor (film), a 1961 South African film
 "Tremors" (Arrow), an episode of Arrow
 "Tremors" (Supergirl), an episode of Supergirl

Games
 Tremors: The Game, canceled video game based on the movies
 Tremors (roller coaster), a roller coaster located at Silverwood Theme Park
 Tremor (comics), a character in the comic series Spawn
 Tremor, a Mortal Kombat character, featured in the video game Mortal Kombat: Special Forces

Other
 Tremor (software), the integer-only Vorbis audio decoding library
 "Tremor" (song), a 2014 song by Martin Garrix and Dimitri Vegas & Like Mike
 Tremors (Sohn album)
 Tremors (Great Northern album)

See also
 Tremble (disambiguation)